The  (lit. Tōkai Ring Expressway) is a toll road in the Tōkai region of Japan. It is owned and managed by Central Nippon Expressway Company.

Naming

Officially, the route is designated as National Route 475. On some signs, the expressway is represented in Japanese as 東海環状道; this is done to prevent confusion with the Tōkai-Hokuriku Expressway.

Although the road is named as an expressway, it is not recognized as a national expressway. However, the design standard of the Tōkai-Kanjō Expressway is similar to most national expressways.

Overview

Once completed, the expressway will form a 160 km ring road for the Tōkai Region. It is hoped that the expressway will reduce traffic congestion, link important industrial and manufacturing centers in the region, and facilitate access to Chubu International Airport and tourist areas in rural Gifu Prefecture.

Currently 73 km of the route has been opened to traffic. This section was opened in 2005 to coincide with the opening of Expo 2005 in Aichi Prefecture. There are 4 lanes of traffic from Toyota-higashi Junction to Toki Junction, and 2 lanes from Toki Junction to Mino-Seki Junction.

List of interchanges and features

 IC - interchange,  SIC - smart interchange, JCT - junction, SA - service area, PA - parking area

References

External links
 Central Nippon Expressway Company

Toll roads in Japan
Proposed roads in Japan
Roads in Aichi Prefecture
Roads in Gifu Prefecture
Roads in Mie Prefecture